This is a list of notable fellows of the Australian Institute of Company Directors (AICD).

Fellow is one of six categories of membership.  It has the post nominal FAICD.

A

 Charles Abbott (born 1939)
 Martin Albrecht
 Elizabeth Alexander (born 1943)
 Kym Anderson (born 1950)
 Marilyn Anderson
 Larry Anthony (born 1961)
 Peter Arnison (born 1940)

Back to top

B

 Brian J. Boyle
 Mal Bryce (1943–2018)
 Ross Butler (born 1943)

Back to top

C

 Megan Clark

Back to top

D

 Andrew Darbyshire, author
 Roger Dean (born 1948)
 Annabel Digance
 Steve Doszpot (1948–2017)

Back to top

F

 Ahmed Fahour (born 1966)
 Ian Frazer (born 1953)
 Philip Freier (born 1954)

Back to top

G

 Geoff Garrett
 Peter Gray (born 1946)
 Stephen Gumley (born 1956)

Back to top

H

 Ian Harper
 Catherine Harris
 Allan Hawke (born 1948)
 Iain Hay author and academic (born 1960)
 Milton Hearn (born 1943)
 Katrina Hodgkinson (born 1966)

Back to top

I

 Graeme Innes (born 1955)
 Annie Ivanova, author

Back to top

K

 Stephen Koroknay (born 1946)

Back to top

L

 Andrew Lindberg (born 1954)
 Paul Little (born 1947)
 Jim Longley (born 1958)
 Jeffrey Lucy (born 1946)

Back to top

M

 Alan Manly (born 1950), author
 Ron Manners (born 1936)
 John Marlay
 Nigel McBride
 Simon McKeon (born 1955)
 Sam McMahon (born 1967)
 Justin Milne (born 1952)
 Jim Molan (born 1950)
 Tony Mooney
 Rupert Myer (born 1958)

Back to top

N

 Gary Neat (born 1948), journalist

Back to top

O

 Jonathan O'Dea (born 1966)
 Greg O'Neill (born 1962)

Back to top

P

 James Pearson
 Jim Petrich
 Susan Pond
 John B. Prescott (born 1940)

Back to top

Q

 John Quiggin (born 1956)

Back to top

R

 John Rosenberg

Back to top

S

 Silvio Salom (born 1959)
 George Savvides (born 1956)
 Steven Schwartz (born 1946)
 Helen Scott-Orr
 David Shackleton (born 1948)
 Ann Caroline Sherry (born 1954)
 Peter Smedley
 Erica Smyth (born 1952)
 Georgie Somerset (born 1967)
 Robert Stable
 Andrew Stewart Coats (born 1958)
 Ziggy Switkowski (born 1948)

Back to top

T

 Jan Thomas
 Matt Tripovich (born 1956)

Back to top

V

 Cesar L. Villanueva

Back to top

W

 Sam Walsh (born 1949)
 Anthony S. Weiss
 Ian Herbert White (born 1949)
 Brenda Wilson

Back to top

Z

 Christian Zahra (born 1973)
 Alex Zelinsky (born 1960)

Back to top

References

 
Lists of Australian people
Lists of people by organization
Lists of businesspeople